Kahl is a 1961 West German short documentary film about the Kahl Nuclear Power Plant. It was nominated for an Academy Award for Best Documentary Short.

References

External links

1961 films
1961 documentary films
1961 short films
1960s short documentary films
1960s German-language films
West German films
German short documentary films
Documentary films about nuclear technology
Films set in Bavaria
1960s German films